The Atlantic slave trade, transatlantic slave trade, or Euro-American slave trade involved the transportation by slave traders of enslaved African people, mainly to the Americas. The slave trade regularly used the triangular trade route and its Middle Passage, and existed from the 16th to the 19th centuries. The vast majority of those who were transported in the transatlantic slave trade were people from Central and West Africa that had been sold by other West Africans to Western European slave traders, while others had been captured directly by the slave traders in coastal raids; Europeans gathered and imprisoned the enslaved at forts on the African coast and then brought them to the Americas. Except for the Portuguese, European slave traders generally did not participate in the raids because life expectancy for Europeans in sub-Saharan Africa was less than one year during the period of the slave trade (which was prior to the widespread availability of quinine as a treatment for malaria). The colonial South Atlantic and Caribbean economies were particularly dependent on labour for the production of sugarcane and other commodities. This was viewed as crucial by those Western European states which, in the late 17th and 18th centuries, were vying with one another to create overseas empires.

The Portuguese, in the 16th century, were the first to buy slaves from West African slavers and transport them across the Atlantic. In 1526, they completed the first transatlantic slave voyage to Brazil, and other Europeans soon followed. Shipowners regarded the slaves as cargo to be transported to the Americas as quickly and cheaply as possible, there to be sold to work on coffee, tobacco, cocoa, sugar, and cotton plantations, gold and silver mines, rice fields, the construction industry, cutting timber for ships, as skilled labour, and as domestic servants. The first Africans kidnapped to the English colonies were classified as indentured servants, with legal standing similar to that of contract-based workers coming from Britain and Ireland. However, by the middle of the 17th century, slavery had hardened as a racial caste, with African slaves and their future offspring being legally the property of their owners, as children born to slave mothers were also slaves (partus sequitur ventrem). As property, the people were considered merchandise or units of labour, and were sold at markets with other goods and services.

The major Atlantic slave-trading nations, in order of trade volume, were Portugal, Britain, Spain, France, the Netherlands, and Denmark. Several had established outposts on the African coast, where they purchased slaves from local African leaders. These slaves were managed by a factor, who was established on or near the coast to expedite the shipping of slaves to the New World. Slaves were imprisoned in a factory while awaiting shipment. Current estimates are that about 12 million to 12.8 million Africans were shipped across the Atlantic over a span of 400 years. The number purchased by the traders was considerably higher, as the passage had a high death rate with approximately 1.2–2.4 million dying during the voyage and millions more in seasoning camps in the Caribbean after arrival in the New World. Millions of people also died as a result of slave raids, wars, and during transport to the coast for sale to European slave traders. Near the beginning of the 19th century, various governments acted to ban the trade, although illegal smuggling still occurred. In the early 21st century, several governments issued apologies for the transatlantic slave trade.

Background

Atlantic travel

The Atlantic slave trade developed after trade contacts were established between the "Old World" (Afro-Eurasia) and the "New World" (the Americas). For centuries, tidal currents had made ocean travel particularly difficult and risky for the ships that were then available. Thus, there had been very little, if any, maritime contact between the peoples living in these continents. In the 15th century, however, new European developments in seafaring technologies resulted in ships being better equipped to deal with the tidal currents, and could begin traversing the Atlantic Ocean; the Portuguese set up a Navigator's School (although there is much debate about whether it existed and if it did, just what it was). Between 1600 and 1800, approximately 300,000 sailors engaged in the slave trade visited West Africa. In doing so, they came into contact with societies living along the west African coast and in the Americas which they had never previously encountered. Historian Pierre Chaunu termed the consequences of European navigation "disenclavement", with it marking an end of isolation for some societies and an increase in inter-societal contact for most others.

Historian John Thornton noted, "A number of technical and geographical factors combined to make Europeans the most likely people to explore the Atlantic and develop its commerce". He identified these as being the drive to find new and profitable commercial opportunities outside Europe. Additionally, there was the desire to create an alternative trade network to that controlled by the Muslim Ottoman Empire of the Middle East, which was viewed as a commercial, political and religious threat to European Christendom. In particular, European traders wanted to trade for gold, which could be found in western Africa, and also to find a maritime route to "the Indies" (India), where they could trade for luxury goods such as spices without having to obtain these items from Middle Eastern Islamic traders.

During the first wave of European colonization, although many of the initial Atlantic naval explorations were led by the Iberian conquistadors, members of many European nationalities were involved, including sailors from Spain, Portugal, France, England, the Italian states, and the Netherlands. This diversity led Thornton to describe the initial "exploration of the Atlantic" as "a truly international exercise, even if many of the dramatic discoveries were made under the sponsorship of the Iberian monarchs". That leadership later gave rise to the myth that "the Iberians were the sole leaders of the exploration".

European overseas expansion led to the contact between the Old and New Worlds producing the Columbian exchange, named after the Italian explorer Christopher Columbus. It started the global silver trade from the 16th to 18th centuries and led to direct European involvement in the Chinese porcelain trade. It involved the transfer of goods unique to one hemisphere to another. Europeans brought cattle, horses, and sheep to the New World, and from the New World Europeans received tobacco, potatoes, tomatoes, and maize. Other items and commodities becoming important in global trade were the tobacco, sugarcane, and cotton crops of the Americas, along with the gold and silver brought from the American continent not only to Europe but elsewhere in the Old World.

European slavery in Portugal and Spain
By the 15th century, slavery had existed in the Iberian Peninsula (Portugal and Spain) of Western Europe throughout recorded history. The Roman Empire had established its system of slavery in ancient times. Since the fall of the Western Roman Empire, various systems of slavery continued in the successor Islamic and Christian kingdoms of the peninsula through the early modern era of the Atlantic slave trade.

African slavery

Slavery was prevalent in many parts of Africa for many centuries before the beginning of the Atlantic slave trade. There is evidence that enslaved people from some parts of Africa were exported to states in Africa, Europe, and Asia prior to the European colonization of the Americas.

The Atlantic slave trade was not the only slave trade from Africa, although it was the largest in intensity in terms of number of humans over a unit of time. As Elikia M'bokolo wrote in Le Monde diplomatique:

However, estimates are imprecise, which can affect comparison between different slave trades. Two rough estimates by scholars of the numbers African slaves held over twelve centuries in the Muslim world are 11.5 million and 14 million, while other estimates indicate a number between 12 and 15 million African slaves prior to the 20th century.

According to John K. Thornton, Europeans usually bought enslaved people who were captured in endemic warfare between African states. Some Africans had made a business out of capturing Africans from neighboring ethnic groups or war captives and selling them. A reminder of this practice is documented in the Slave Trade Debates of England in the early 19th century: "All the old writers ... concur in stating not only that wars are entered into for the sole purpose of making slaves, but that they are fomented by Europeans, with a view to that object." People living around the Niger River were transported from these markets to the coast and sold at European trading ports in exchange for muskets and manufactured goods such as cloth or alcohol. However, the European demand for slaves provided a large new market for the already existing trade. While those held in slavery in their own region of Africa might hope to escape, those shipped away had little chance of returning to Africa.

European colonization and slavery in West Africa

Upon discovering new lands through their naval explorations, European colonisers soon began to migrate to and settle in lands outside their native continent. Off the coast of Africa, European migrants, under the directions of the Kingdom of Castile, invaded and colonised the Canary Islands during the 15th century, where they converted much of the land to the production of wine and sugar. Along with this, they also captured native Canary Islanders, the Guanches, to use as slaves both on the Islands and across the Christian Mediterranean.

As historian John Thornton remarked, "the actual motivation for European expansion and for navigational breakthroughs was little more than to exploit the opportunity for immediate profits made by raiding and the seizure or purchase of trade commodities". Using the Canary Islands as a naval base, Europeans, at the time primarily Portuguese traders, began to move their activities down the western coast of Africa, performing raids in which slaves would be captured to be later sold in the Mediterranean. Although initially successful in this venture, "it was not long before African naval forces were alerted to the new dangers, and the Portuguese [raiding] ships began to meet strong and effective resistance", with the crews of several of them being killed by African sailors, whose boats were better equipped at traversing the west African coasts and river systems.

By 1494, the Portuguese king had entered agreements with the rulers of several West African states that would allow trade between their respective peoples, enabling the Portuguese to "tap into" the "well-developed commercial economy in Africa ... without engaging in hostilities". "Peaceful trade became the rule all along the African coast", although there were some rare exceptions when acts of aggression led to violence. For instance, Portuguese traders attempted to conquer the Bissagos Islands in 1535. In 1571 Portugal, supported by the Kingdom of Kongo, took control of the south-western region of Angola in order to secure its threatened economic interest in the area. Although Kongo later joined a coalition in 1591 to force the Portuguese out, Portugal had secured a foothold on the continent that it continued to occupy until the 20th century. Despite these incidents of occasional violence between African and European forces, many African states ensured that any trade went on in their own terms, for instance, imposing custom duties on foreign ships. In 1525, the Kongolese King Afonso I seized a French vessel and its crew for illegally trading on his coast.

Historians have widely debated the nature of the relationship between these African kingdoms and the European traders. The Guyanese historian Walter Rodney (1972) has argued that it was an unequal relationship, with Africans being forced into a "colonial" trade with the more economically developed Europeans, exchanging raw materials and human resources (i.e. slaves) for manufactured goods. He argued that it was this economic trade agreement dating back to the 16th century that led to Africa being underdeveloped in his own time. These ideas were supported by other historians, including Ralph Austen (1987). This idea of an unequal relationship was contested by John Thornton (1998), who argued that "the Atlantic slave trade was not nearly as critical to the African economy as these scholars believed" and that "African manufacturing [at this period] was more than capable of handling competition from preindustrial Europe". However, Anne Bailey, commenting on Thornton's suggestion that Africans and Europeans were equal partners in the Atlantic slave trade, wrote:

16th, 17th, and 18th centuries

The Atlantic slave trade is customarily divided into two eras, known as the first and second Atlantic systems. Slightly more than 3% of the enslaved people exported from Africa were traded between 1525 and 1600, and 16% in the 17th century.

The first Atlantic system was the trade of enslaved Africans to, primarily, American colonies of the Portuguese and Spanish empires. Before the 1520s, slavers took Africans to Seville or the Canary Islands and then exported some of them from Spain to its colonies in Hispaniola and Puerto Rico, with 1 to 40 slaves per ship. These supplemented enslaved Native Americans. In 1518 the Spanish king gave permission for ships to go directly from Africa to the Caribbean colonies, and they started taking 200-300 per trip.

During the first Atlantic system, most of these slavers were Portuguese, giving them a near-monopoly. Decisive was the 1494 Treaty of Tordesillas which did not allow Spanish ships in African ports. Spain had to rely on Portuguese ships and sailors to bring slaves across the Atlantic. From 1525, slaves were transported directly from the Portuguese colony of Sao Tomé across the Atlantic to Hispaniola. 

A burial ground in Campeche, Mexico, suggests enslaved Africans had been brought there not long after Hernán Cortés completed the subjugation of Aztec and Mayan Mexico in 1519. The graveyard had been in use from approximately 1550 to the late 17th century.

In 1562 John Hawkins captured Africans in what is now Sierra Leone and took 300 people to sell in the Caribbean. In 1564 he repeated the process, using Queen Elizabeth's own ship, Jesus of Lübeck, and there were more English voyages after that.

Around 1560, the Portuguese began a regular slave trade to Brazil. From 1580 until 1640, Portugal was temporarily united with Spain in the Iberian Union. Most Portuguese contractors who obtained the asiento between 1580 and 1640 were conversos. For Portuguese merchants, many of whom were "New Christians" or their descendants, the union of crowns presented commercial opportunities in the slave trade to Spanish America.

Until the middle of the 17th century, Mexico was the largest single market for slaves in Spanish America. While the Portuguese were directly involved in trading enslaved peoples to Brazil, the Spanish Empire relied on the Asiento de Negros system, awarding (Catholic) Genoese merchant bankers the license to trade enslaved people from Africa to their colonies in Spanish America. Cartagena, Veracruz, Buenos Aires, and Hispaniola received the majority of slave arrivals, mainly from Angola. This division of the slave trade between Spain and Portugal upset the British and the Dutch who invested in the British West Indies and Dutch Brazil producing sugar. After the Iberian Union fell apart, Spain prohibited Portugal from directly engaging in the slave trade as a carrier. According the Treaty of Munster the slave trade was opened for the traditional enemies of Spain, losing a large share of the trade to the Dutch, French, and English. For 150 years, Spanish transatlantic traffic was operating at trivial levels. In many years, not a single Spanish slave voyage set sail from Africa. Unlike all of their imperial competitors, the Spanish almost never delivered slaves to foreign territories. By contrast, the British, and the Dutch before them, sold slaves everywhere in the Americas.

The second Atlantic system was the trade of enslaved Africans by mostly English, French, and Dutch traders and investors. The main destinations of this phase were the Caribbean islands Curaçao, Jamaica and Martinique, as European nations built up economically slave-dependent colonies in the New World. In 1672, the Royal Africa Company was founded. In 1674, the New West India Company became deeper involved in slave trade. From 1677, the Compagnie du Sénégal, used Gorée to house the slaves. The Spanish proposed to get the slaves from Cape Verde, located closer to the demarcation line between the Spanish and Portuguese empire, but this was against the WIC-charter". The Royal African Company usually refused to deliver slaves to Spanish colonies, though they did sell them to all comers from their factories in Kingston, Jamaica and Bridgetown, Barbados. In 1682, Spain allowed governors from Havana, Porto Bello, Panama, and Cartagena, Colombia to procure slaves from Jamaica.

By the 1690s, the English were shipping the most slaves from West Africa. By the 18th century, Portuguese Angola had become again one of the principal sources of the Atlantic slave trade. After the end of the War of the Spanish Succession, as part of the provisions of the Treaty of Utrecht (1713), the Asiento was granted to the South Sea Company. Despite the South Sea Bubble, the British maintained this position during the 18th century, becoming the biggest shippers of slaves across the Atlantic. It is estimated that more than half of the entire slave trade took place during the 18th century, with the British, Portuguese and French being the main carriers of nine out of ten slaves abducted in Africa.  At the time, slave trading was regarded as crucial to Europe's maritime economy, as noted by one English slave trader: "What a glorious and advantageous trade this is ... It is the hinge on which all the trade of this globe moves."

Meanwhile, it became a business for privately owned enterprises, reducing international complications. After 1790, by contrast, captains typically checked out slave prices in at least two of the major markets of Kingston, Havana, and Charleston, South Carolina (where prices by then were similar) before deciding where to sell. For the last sixteen years of the transatlantic slave trade, Spain was the only transatlantic slave-trading empire.

Following the British and United States' bans on the African slave trade in 1807, it declined, but the period after still accounted for 28.5% of the total volume of the Atlantic slave trade.  Between 1810 and 1860, over 3.5 million slaves were transported, with 850,000 in the 1820s.

Triangular trade

The first side of the triangle was the export of goods from Europe to Africa. A number of African kings and merchants took part in the trading of enslaved people from 1440 to about 1833. For each captive, the African rulers would receive a variety of goods from Europe. These included guns, ammunition, alcohol, indigo dyed Indian textiles, and other factory-made goods. The second leg of the triangle exported enslaved Africans across the Atlantic Ocean to the Americas and the Caribbean Islands. The third and final part of the triangle was the return of goods to Europe from the Americas. The goods were the products of slave plantations and included cotton, sugar, tobacco, molasses and rum. Sir John Hawkins, considered the pioneer of the English slave trade, was the first to run the triangular trade, making a profit at every stop.

Labour and slavery

The Atlantic slave trade was the result of, among other things, labour shortage, itself in turn created by the desire of European colonists to exploit New World land and resources for capital profits. Native peoples were at first utilized as slave labour by Europeans until a large number died from overwork and Old World diseases. Alternative sources of labour, such as indentured servitude, failed to provide a sufficient workforce. Many crops could not be sold for profit, or even grown, in Europe. Exporting crops and goods from the New World to Europe often proved to be more profitable than producing them on the European mainland. A vast amount of labour was needed to create and sustain plantations that required intensive labour to grow, harvest, and process prized tropical crops. Western Africa (part of which became known as "the Slave Coast"), Angola and nearby Kingdoms and later Central Africa, became the source for enslaved people to meet the demand for labour.

The basic reason for the constant shortage of labour was that, with much cheap land available and many landowners searching for workers, free European immigrants were able to become landowners themselves relatively quickly, thus increasing the need for workers.

Thomas Jefferson attributed the use of slave labour in part to the climate, and the consequent idle leisure afforded by slave labour: "For in a warm climate, no man will labour for himself who can make another labour for him. This is so true, that of the proprietors of slaves a very small proportion indeed are ever seen to labour." In a 2015 paper, economist Elena Esposito argued that the enslavement of Africans in colonial America was attributable to the fact that the American south was sufficiently warm and humid for malaria to thrive; the disease had debilitating effects on the European settlers. Conversely, many enslaved Africans were taken from regions of Africa which hosted particularly potent strains of the disease, so the Africans had already developed natural resistance to malaria. This, Esposito argued, resulted in higher malaria survival rates in the American south among enslaved Africans than among European labourers, making them a more profitable source of labour and encouraging their use.

Historian David Eltis argues that Africans were enslaved because of cultural beliefs in Europe that prohibited the enslavement of cultural insiders, even if there was a source of labour that could be enslaved (such as convicts, prisoners of war and vagrants). Eltis argues that traditional beliefs existed in Europe against enslaving Christians (few Europeans not being Christian at the time) and those slaves that existed in Europe tended to be non-Christians and their immediate descendants (since a slave converting to Christianity did not guarantee emancipation) and thus by the fifteenth century Europeans as a whole came to be regarded as insiders. Eltis argues that while all slave societies have demarked insiders and outsiders, Europeans took this process further by extending the status of insider to the entire European continent, rendering it unthinkable to enslave a European since this would require enslaving an insider. Conversely, Africans were viewed as outsiders and thus qualified for enslavement. While Europeans may have treated some types of labour, such as convict labour, with conditions similar to that of slaves, these labourers would not be regarded as chattel and their progeny could not inherit their subordinate status, thus not making them slaves in the eyes of Europeans. The status of chattel slavery was thus confined to non-Europeans, such as Africans.

African participation in the slave trade

Africans played a direct role in the slave trade, kidnapping adults and stealing children for the purpose of selling them, through intermediaries, to Europeans or their agents. Those sold into slavery were usually from a different ethnic group than those who captured them, whether enemies or just neighbors. These captive slaves were considered "other", not part of the people of the ethnic group or "tribe"; African kings were only interested in protecting their own ethnic group, but sometimes criminals would be sold to get rid of them. Most other slaves were obtained from kidnappings, or through raids that occurred at gunpoint through joint ventures with the Europeans.

According to Pernille Ipsen, author of Daughters of the Trade: Atlantic Slavers and Interracial Marriage on the Gold Coast, Africans from the Gold Coast (present-day Ghana) also participated in the slave trade through intermarriage, or cassare (taken from Italian, Spanish, or Portuguese), meaning 'to set up house'. It is derived from the Portuguese word 'casar', meaning 'to marry'. Cassare formed political and economic bonds between European and African slave traders. Cassare was a pre-European-contact practice used to integrate the "other" from a differing African tribe. Early on in the Atlantic slave trade, it was common for the powerful elite West African families to marry off their women to the European traders in alliance, bolstering their syndicate. The marriages were even performed using African customs, which Europeans did not object to, seeing how important the connections were.

African awareness of the conditions of the slave trade
It is difficult to reconstruct and generalize how Africans residing in Africa understood the Atlantic slave trade, though there is evidence for some societies that African elites and slave traders had awareness of the conditions of the slaves who were transported to the Americas. According to Robin Law, the royal elites of the kingdom of Dahomey must have had an "informed understanding" of the fates of the Africans they sold into slavery.  Dahomey sent diplomats to Brazil and Portugal who returned with information about their trips. In addition, a few royal elites of Dahomey had experienced slavery for themselves in the Americas before returning to their homeland.  The only apparent moral issue that the kingdom had with slavery was the enslavement of fellow Dahomeyans, an offense punishable by death, rather than the institution of slavery itself.

On the Gold Coast, it was common for slave-trading African rulers to encourage their children to learn about Europeans by sending them to sail on European ships, live inside European forts, or travel to Europe or America for an education. Diplomats also traveled to European capital cities. The elites even rescued fellow elites who were tricked into slavery in the Americas by sending demands to the Dutch and the British governments, who complied due to fears of reduced trade and physical harm to hostages. An example is the case of William Ansah Sessarakoo, who was rescued from slavery in Barbados after being recognised by a visiting slave trader of the same Fante ethnic group, and later became a slave trader himself. 

Fenda Lawrence was a slave trader from the Gambia who lived and traded in Georgia and South Carolina as a free person.

A common assumption by Africans who were unaware of the true purpose of the Atlantic slave trade was that the Europeans were cannibals who planned on cooking and eating their captives. This rumour was a common source of significant distress for enslaved Africans.

European participation in the slave trade
Europeans provided the market for slaves, rarely traveling beyond the coast or entering the African interior, due to fear of disease and native resistance. They typically resided in fortresses on the coasts, where they waited for Africans to provide them captured slaves from the interior in exchange for goods. Cases of European merchants kidnapping free Africans into slavery often resulted in fierce retaliation from Africans, who stopped trade or captured or killed Europeans. Europeans who desired safe and uninterrupted trade aimed to prevent kidnapping incidents, and the British passed the "Acts of Parliament for Regulating the Slave Trade" in 1750 which outlawed the abduction of free Africans by "fraud, force, or violence". In parts of Africa, convicted criminals could be punished by enslavement, a punishment which became more prevalent as slavery became more lucrative. Since most of these nations did not have a prison system, convicts were often sold or used in the scattered local domestic slave market.

In 1778, Thomas Kitchin estimated that Europeans were bringing an estimated 52,000 slaves to the Caribbean yearly, with the French bringing the most Africans to the French West Indies (13,000 out of the yearly estimate). The Atlantic slave trade peaked in the last two decades of the 18th century, during and following the Kongo Civil War. Wars among tiny states along the Niger River's Igbo-inhabited region and the accompanying banditry also spiked in this period. Another reason for surplus supply of enslaved people was major warfare conducted by expanding states, such as the kingdom of Dahomey, the Oyo Empire, and the Ashanti Empire.

Slavery in Africa and the New World contrasted

Forms of slavery varied both in Africa and in the New World. In general, slavery in Africa was not heritable—that is, the children of slaves were free—while in the Americas, children of slave mothers were considered born into slavery. This was connected to another distinction: slavery in West Africa was not reserved for racial or religious minorities, as it was in European colonies, although the case was otherwise in places such as Somalia, where Bantus were taken as slaves for the ethnic Somalis.

The treatment of slaves in Africa was more variable than in the Americas. At one extreme, the kings of Dahomey routinely slaughtered slaves in hundreds or thousands in sacrificial rituals, and slaves as human sacrifices were also known in Cameroon. On the other hand, slaves in other places were often treated as part of the family, "adopted children", with significant rights including the right to marry without their masters' permission. Scottish explorer Mungo Park wrote:

In the Americas, slaves were denied the right to marry freely and masters did not generally accept them as equal members of the family. New World slaves were considered the property of their owners, and slaves convicted of revolt or murder were executed.

Slave market regions and participation

Europeans would buy and ship slaves to the Western Hemisphere from markets across West Africa. The number of enslaved people sold to the New World varied throughout the slave trade. As for the distribution of slaves from regions of activity, certain areas produced far more enslaved people than others. Between 1650 and 1900, 10.2 million enslaved Africans arrived in the Americas from the following regions in the following proportions:
 Senegambia (Senegal and the Gambia): 4.8%
 Upper Guinea (Guinea-Bissau, Guinea and Sierra Leone): 4.1%
 Windward Coast (Liberia and Ivory Coast): 1.8%
 Gold Coast (Ghana and east of Ivory Coast): 10.4%
 Bight of Benin (Togo, Benin and Nigeria west of the Niger Delta): 20.2%
 Bight of Biafra (Nigeria east of the Niger Delta, Cameroon, Equatorial Guinea and Gabon): 14.6%
 West Central Africa (Republic of Congo, Democratic Republic of Congo and Angola): 39.4%
 Southeastern Africa (Mozambique and Madagascar): 4.7%

Although the slave trade was largely global, there was considerable intracontinental slave trade in which 8 million people were enslaved within the African continent. Of those who did move out of Africa, 8 million were forced out of Eastern Africa to be sent to Asia.

African kingdoms of the era

There were over 173 city-states and kingdoms in the African regions affected by the slave trade between 1502 and 1853, when Brazil became the last Atlantic import nation to outlaw the slave trade. Of those 173, no fewer than 68 could be deemed nation states with political and military infrastructures that enabled them to dominate their neighbours. Nearly every present-day nation had a pre-colonial predecessor, sometimes an African empire with which European traders had to barter.

Ethnic groups
The different ethnic groups brought to the Americas closely correspond to the regions of heaviest activity in the slave trade. Over 45 distinct ethnic groups were taken to the Americas during the trade. Of the 45, the ten most prominent, according to slave documentation of the era are listed below.
 The BaKongo of the Democratic Republic of Congo, the Republic of the Congo and Angola
 The Mandé of Upper Guinea
 The Gbe speakers of Togo, Ghana, and Benin (Adja, Mina, Ewe, Fon)
 The Akan of Ghana and Ivory Coast
 The Wolof of Senegal and the Gambia
 The Igbo of southeastern Nigeria
 The Mbundu of Angola (includes both Ambundu and Ovimbundu)
 The Yoruba of southwestern Nigeria
 The Chamba of Cameroon
 The Makua of Mozambique

Human toll

The transatlantic slave trade resulted in a vast and as yet unknown loss of life for African captives both in and outside the Americas. "More than a million people are thought to have died" during their transport to the New World according to a BBC report. More died soon after their arrival. The number of lives lost in the procurement of slaves remains a mystery but may equal or exceed the number who survived to be enslaved.

The trade led to the destruction of individuals and cultures. Historian Ana Lucia Araujo has noted that the process of enslavement did not end with arrival on Western Hemisphere shores; the different paths taken by the individuals and groups who were victims of the Atlantic slave trade were influenced by different factors—including the disembarking region, the ability to be sold on the market, the kind of work performed, gender, age, religion, and language.

Patrick Manning estimates that about 12 million slaves entered the Atlantic trade between the 16th and 19th century, but about 1.5 million died on board ship. About 10.5 million slaves arrived in the Americas. Besides the slaves who died on the Middle Passage, more Africans likely died during the slave raids and wars in Africa and forced marches to ports. Manning estimates that 4 million died inside Africa after capture, and many more died young. Manning's estimate covers the 12 million who were originally destined for the Atlantic, as well as the 6 million destined for Asian slave markets and the 8 million destined for African markets. Of the slaves shipped to the Americas, the largest share went to Brazil and the Caribbean.

Canadian scholar Adam Jones characterized the deaths of millions of Africans during the Atlantic slave trade as genocide. He called it "one of the worst holocausts in human history", and claims arguments to the contrary such as "it was in slave owners' interest to keep slaves alive, not exterminate them" to be "mostly sophistry" stating: "the killing and destruction were intentional, whatever the incentives to preserve survivors of the Atlantic passage for labour exploitation. To revisit the issue of intent already touched on: If an institution is deliberately maintained and expanded by discernible agents, though all are aware of the hecatombs of casualties it is inflicting on a definable human group, then why should this not qualify as genocide?"

Saidiya Hartman has argued that the deaths of enslaved people was incidental to the acquisition of profit and to the rise of capitalism: "Death wasn't a goal of its own but just a by-product of commerce, which has the lasting effect of making negligible all the millions of lives lost. Incidental death occurs when life has no normative value, when no humans are involved, when the population is, in effect, seen as already dead." Hartman highlights how the Atlantic slave trade created millions of corpses but, unlike the concentration camp or the gulag, extermination was not the final objective; it was a corollary to the making of commodities.

Destinations and flags of carriers 
Most of the Atlantic slave trade was carried out by seven nations and most of the slaves were carried to their own colonies in the new world. But there was also significant other trading which is shown in the table below. The records are not complete, and some data is uncertain. The last rows show that there were also smaller numbers of slaves carried to Europe and to other parts of Africa, and at least 1.8 million did not survive the journey and were buried at sea with little ceremony.
 

The timeline chart when the different nations transported most of their slaves.

The regions of Africa from which these slaves were taken is given in the following table, from the same source.

African conflicts

According to Kimani Nehusi, the presence of European slavers affected the way in which the legal code in African societies responded to offenders. Crimes traditionally punishable by some other form of punishment became punishable by enslavement and sale to slave traders. According to David Stannard's American Holocaust, 50% of African deaths occurred in Africa as a result of wars between native kingdoms, which produced the majority of slaves. This includes not only those who died in battles but also those who died as a result of forced marches from inland areas to slave ports on the various coasts. The practice of enslaving enemy combatants and their villages was widespread throughout Western and West Central Africa, although wars were rarely started to procure slaves. The slave trade was largely a by-product of tribal and state warfare as a way of removing potential dissidents after victory or financing future wars. However, some African groups proved particularly adept and brutal at the practice of enslaving, such as Bono State, Oyo, Benin, Igala, Kaabu, Ashanti, Dahomey, the Aro Confederacy and the Imbangala war bands.

In letters written by the Manikongo, Nzinga Mbemba Afonso, to the King João III of Portugal, he writes that Portuguese merchandise flowing in is what is fueling the trade in Africans. He requests the King of Portugal to stop sending merchandise but should only send missionaries. In one of his letters he writes:

Before the arrival of the Portuguese, slavery had already existed in the Kingdom of Kongo. Afonso I of Kongo believed that the slave trade should be subject to Kongo law. When he suspected the Portuguese of receiving illegally enslaved persons to sell, he wrote to King João III in 1526 imploring him to put a stop to the practice.

The kings of Dahomey sold war captives into transatlantic slavery; they would otherwise have been killed in a ceremony known as the Annual Customs. As one of West Africa's principal slave states, Dahomey became extremely unpopular with neighbouring peoples. Like the Bambara Empire to the east, the Khasso kingdoms depended heavily on the slave trade for their economy. A family's status was indicated by the number of slaves it owned, leading to wars for the sole purpose of taking more captives. This trade led the Khasso into increasing contact with the European settlements of Africa's west coast, particularly the French. Benin grew increasingly rich during the 16th and 17th centuries on the slave trade with Europe; slaves from enemy states of the interior were sold and carried to the Americas in Dutch and Portuguese ships. The Bight of Benin's shore soon came to be known as the "Slave Coast".

King Gezo of Dahomey said in the 1840s:

In 1807, the UK Parliament passed the Bill that abolished the trading of slaves. The King of Bonny (now in Nigeria) was horrified at the conclusion of the practice:

Port factories
After being marched to the coast for sale, enslaved people were held in large forts called factories. The amount of time in factories varied, but Milton Meltzer states in Slavery: A World History that around 4.5% of deaths attributed to the transatlantic slave trade occurred during this phase. In other words, over 820,000 people are believed to have died in African ports such as Benguela, Elmina, and Bonny, reducing the number of those shipped to 17.5 million.

Atlantic shipment

After being captured and held in the factories, slaves entered the infamous Middle Passage. Meltzer's research puts this phase of the slave trade's overall mortality at 12.5%. Their deaths were the result of brutal treatment and poor care from the time of their capture and throughout their voyage. Around 2.2 million Africans died during these voyages, where they were packed into tight, unsanitary spaces on ships for months at a time. Measures were taken to stem the onboard mortality rate, such as enforced "dancing" (as exercise) above deck and the practice of force-feeding enslaved persons who tried to starve themselves. The conditions on board also resulted in the spread of fatal diseases. Other fatalities were suicides, slaves who escaped by jumping overboard. The slave traders would try to fit anywhere from 350 to 600 slaves on one ship. Before the African slave trade was completely banned by participating nations in 1853, 15.3 million enslaved people had arrived in the Americas.

Raymond L. Cohn, an economics professor whose research has focused on economic history and international migration, has researched the mortality rates among Africans during the voyages of the Atlantic slave trade. He found that mortality rates decreased over the history of the slave trade, primarily because the length of time necessary for the voyage was declining. "In the eighteenth century many slave voyages took at least 2½ months. In the nineteenth century, 2 months appears to have been the maximum length of the voyage, and many voyages were far shorter. Fewer slaves died in the Middle Passage over time mainly because the passage was shorter."

Despite the vast profits of slavery, the ordinary sailors on slave ships were badly paid and subject to harsh discipline. Mortality of around 20%, a number similar and sometimes greater than those of the slaves, was expected in a ship's crew during the course of a voyage; this was due to disease, flogging, overwork, or slave uprisings. Disease (malaria or yellow fever) was the most common cause of death among sailors. A high crew mortality rate on the return voyage was in the captain's interests as it reduced the number of sailors who had to be paid on reaching the home port.

The slave trade was hated by many sailors, and those who joined the crews of slave ships often did so through coercion or because they could find no other employment.

Seasoning camps
Meltzer also states that 33% of Africans would have died in the first year at the seasoning camps found throughout the Caribbean. Jamaica held one of the most notorious of these camps. Dysentery was the leading cause of death.  Captives who could not be sold were inevitably destroyed.  Around 5 million Africans died in these camps, reducing the number of survivors to about 10 million.

Diseases 
Many diseases, each capable of killing a large minority or even a majority of a new human population, arrived in the Americas after 1492. They include smallpox, malaria, bubonic plague, typhus, influenza, measles, diphtheria, yellow fever, and whooping cough. During the Atlantic slave trade following the discovery of the New World, diseases such as these are recorded as causing mass mortality.

Evolutionary history may also have played a role in resisting the diseases of the slave trade. Compared to African and Europeans, New World populations did not have a history of exposure to diseases such as malaria, and therefore, no genetic resistance had been produced as a result of adaptation through natural selection.

Levels and extent of immunity varies from disease to disease. For smallpox and measles for example, those who survive are equipped with the immunity to combat the disease for the rest of their life in that they cannot contract the disease again. There are also diseases, such as malaria, which do not confer effective lasting immunity.

Smallpox 
Epidemics of smallpox were known for causing a significant decrease in the indigenous population of the New World. The effects on survivors included pockmarks on the skin which left deep scars, commonly causing significant disfigurement. Some Europeans, who believed the plague of syphilis in Europe to have come from the Americas, saw smallpox as the European revenge against the Natives. Africans and Europeans, unlike the native population, often had lifelong immunity, because they had often been exposed to minor forms of the illness such as cowpox or variola minor disease in childhood. By the late 16th century there existed some forms of inoculation and variolation in Africa and the Middle East. One practice features Arab traders in Africa "buying-off" the disease in which a cloth that had been previously exposed to the sickness was to be tied to another child's arm to increase immunity. Another practice involved taking pus from a smallpox scab and putting it in the cut of a healthy individual in an attempt to have a mild case of the disease in the future rather than the effects becoming fatal.

European competition
The trade of enslaved Africans in the Atlantic has its origins in the explorations of Portuguese mariners down the coast of West Africa in the 15th century. Before that, contact with African slave markets was made to ransom Portuguese who had been captured by the intense North African Barbary pirate attacks on Portuguese ships and coastal villages, frequently leaving them depopulated. The first Europeans to use enslaved Africans in the New World were the Spaniards, who sought auxiliaries for their conquest expeditions and labourers on islands such as Cuba and Hispaniola. The alarming decline in the native population had spurred the first royal laws protecting them (Laws of Burgos, 1512–13). The first enslaved Africans arrived in Hispaniola in 1501. After Portugal had succeeded in establishing sugar plantations (engenhos) in northern Brazil c. 1545, Portuguese merchants on the West African coast began to supply enslaved Africans to the sugar planters. While at first these planters had relied almost exclusively on the native Tupani for slave labour, after 1570 they began importing Africans, as a series of epidemics had decimated the already destabilized Tupani communities. By 1630, Africans had replaced the Tupani as the largest contingent of labour on Brazilian sugar plantations. This ended the European medieval household tradition of slavery, resulted in Brazil's receiving the most enslaved Africans, and revealed sugar cultivation and processing as the reason that roughly 84% of these Africans were shipped to the New World.

On November 7, 1693, Charles II issued a Royal Decree, providing sanctuary in Spanish Florida for fugitive slaves from the British colony of South Carolina.

As Britain rose in naval power and settled continental North America and some islands of the West Indies, they became the leading slave traders. At one stage the trade was the monopoly of the Royal Africa Company, operating out of London. But, following the loss of the company's monopoly in 1689, Bristol and Liverpool merchants became increasingly involved in the trade. By the late 17th century, one out of every four ships that left Liverpool harbour was a slave trading ship. Much of the wealth on which the city of Manchester, and surrounding towns, was built in the late 18th century, and for much of the 19th century, was based on the processing of slave-picked cotton and manufacture of cloth. Other British cities also profited from the slave trade. Birmingham, the largest gun-producing town in Britain at the time, supplied guns to be traded for slaves. 75% of all sugar produced in the plantations was sent to London, and much of it was consumed in the highly lucrative coffee houses there.

New World destinations
The first slaves to arrive as part of a labour force in the New World reached the island of Hispaniola (now Haiti and the Dominican Republic) in 1502. Cuba received its first four slaves in 1513. Jamaica received its first shipment of 4,000 slaves in 1518. Slave exports to Honduras and Guatemala started in 1526.

The first enslaved Africans to reach what would become the United States arrived in July 1526 as part of a Spanish attempt to colonize San Miguel de Gualdape. By November, the 300 Spanish colonists were reduced to 100, and their slaves from 100 to 70. The enslaved people revolted in 1526 and joined a nearby Native American tribe, while the Spanish abandoned the colony altogether (1527). The area of the future Colombia received its first enslaved people in 1533. El Salvador, Costa Rica, and Florida began their stints in the slave trade in 1541, 1563, and 1581, respectively.

The 17th century saw an increase in shipments. Africans were brought to Point Comfort – several miles downriver from the English colony of Jamestown, Virginia – in 1619. The first kidnapped Africans in English North America were classed as indentured servants and freed after seven years. Virginia law codified chattel slavery in 1656, and in 1662 the colony adopted the principle of partus sequitur ventrem, which classified children of slave mothers as slaves, regardless of paternity. Under British law, children born of white male slave owners and black female slaves would have inherited the father's status and rights. The change to maternal inheritance for slaves guaranteed that anyone born with any slave ancestors was a slave, with no regard to the nature of the relations between the white father and the black mother, consensual or not.

In addition to African persons, indigenous peoples of the Americas were trafficked through Atlantic trade routes. The 1677 work The Doings and Sufferings of the Christian Indians, for example, documents English colonial prisoners of war (not, in fact, opposing combatants, but imprisoned members of English-allied forces) being enslaved and sent to Caribbean destinations. Captive indigenous opponents, including women and children, were also sold into slavery at a substantial profit, to be transported to West Indies colonies.

By 1802, Russian colonists noted that "Boston" (U.S.-based) skippers were trading African slaves for otter pelts with the Tlingit people in Southeast Alaska.

Notes: 
 Before 1820, the number of enslaved Africans transported across the Atlantic to the New World was triple the number of Europeans who reached North and South American shores. At the time this was the largest oceanic displacement or migration in history, eclipsing even the far-flung, but less-dense, expansion of Austronesian-Polynesian explorers.
 The number of Africans who arrived in each region is calculated from the total number of slaves imported, about 10,000,000.
Includes British Guiana and British Honduras

Economics of slavery

In 18th century France, returns for investors in plantations averaged around 6%; as compared to 5% for most domestic alternatives, this represented a 20% profit advantage. Risks—maritime and commercial—were important for individual voyages. Investors mitigated it by buying small shares of many ships at the same time. In that way, they were able to diversify a large part of the risk away. Between voyages, ship shares could be freely sold and bought.

By far the most financially profitable West Indian colonies in 1800 belonged to the United Kingdom. After entering the sugar colony business late, British naval supremacy and control over key islands such as Jamaica, Trinidad, the Leeward Islands, and Barbados and the territory of British Guiana gave it an important edge over all competitors; while many British did not make gains, a handful of individuals made small fortunes. This advantage was reinforced when France lost its most important colony, St. Domingue (western Hispaniola, now Haiti), to a slave revolt in 1791 and supported revolts against its rival Britain, in the name of liberty after the 1793 French revolution. Before 1791, British sugar had to be protected to compete against cheaper French sugar.

After 1791, the British islands produced the most sugar, and the British people quickly became the largest consumers. West Indian sugar became ubiquitous as an additive to Indian tea. It has been estimated that the profits of the slave trade and of West Indian plantations created up to one-in-twenty of every pound circulating in the British economy at the time of the Industrial Revolution in the latter half of the 18th century.

Following the Slavery Abolition Act 1833 which gradually abolished slavery in the British Empire, the UK government took out a loan of £15 million ($4.25 billion in 2023) to compensate former slave owners for the loss of their "property" after their slaves were freed. Compensation was not given to the formerly enslaved people.

Effects

Historian Walter Rodney has argued that at the start of the slave trade in the 16th century, although there was a technological gap between Europe and Africa, it was not very substantial. Both continents were using Iron Age technology. The major advantage that Europe had was in ship building. During the period of slavery, the populations of Europe and the Americas grew exponentially, while the population of Africa remained stagnant. Rodney contended that the profits from slavery were used to fund economic growth and technological advancement in Europe and the Americas. Based on earlier theories by Eric Williams, he asserted that the industrial revolution was at least in part funded by agricultural profits from the Americas. He cited examples such as the invention of the steam engine by James Watt, which was funded by plantation owners from the Caribbean.

Other historians have attacked both Rodney's methodology and accuracy. Joseph C. Miller has argued that the social change and demographic stagnation (which he researched on the example of West Central Africa) was caused primarily by domestic factors. Joseph Inikori provided a new line of argument, estimating counterfactual demographic developments in case the Atlantic slave trade had not existed. Patrick Manning has shown that the slave trade did have a profound impact on African demographics and social institutions, but criticized Inikori's approach for not taking other factors (such as famine and drought) into account, and thus being highly speculative.

Effect on the economy of West Africa

The effect of the trade on African societies is much debated, due to the influx of goods to Africans. Proponents of the slave trade, such as Archibald Dalzel, argued that African societies were robust and not much affected by the trade. In the 19th century, European abolitionists, most prominently Dr. David Livingstone, took the opposite view, arguing that the fragile local economy and societies were being severely harmed by the trade.

Some African rulers saw an economic benefit from trading their subjects with European slave traders. With the exception of Portuguese-controlled Angola, coastal African leaders "generally controlled access to their coasts, and were able to prevent direct enslavement of their subjects and citizens". Thus, as African scholar John Thornton argues, African leaders who allowed the continuation of the slave trade likely derived an economic benefit from selling their subjects to Europeans. The Kingdom of Benin, for instance, participated in the African slave trade, at will, from 1715 to 1735, surprising Dutch traders, who had not expected to buy slaves in Benin. The benefit derived from trading slaves for European goods was enough to make the Kingdom of Benin rejoin the trans-Atlantic slave trade after centuries of non-participation. Such benefits included military technology (specifically guns and gunpowder), gold, or simply maintaining amicable trade relationships with European nations. The slave trade was, therefore, a means for some African elites to gain economic advantages. Historian Walter Rodney estimates that by c.1770, the King of Dahomey was earning an estimated £250,000 per year by selling captive African soldiers and enslaved people to the European slave-traders. Many West African countries also already had a tradition of holding slaves, which was expanded into trade with Europeans.

The Atlantic trade brought new crops to Africa and also more efficient currencies which were adopted by the West African merchants. This can be interpreted as an institutional reform which reduced the cost of doing business. But the developmental benefits were limited as long as the business including slaving.

Both Thornton and Fage contend that while African political elite may have ultimately benefited from the slave trade, their decision to participate may have been influenced more by what they could lose by not participating. In Fage's article "Slavery and the Slave Trade in the Context of West African History", he notes that for West Africans "...there were really few effective means of mobilizing labour for the economic and political needs of the state" without the slave trade.

Effects on the British economy

Historian Eric Williams in 1944 argued that the profits that Britain received from its sugar colonies, or from the slave trade between Africa and the Caribbean, contributed to the financing of Britain's industrial revolution. However, he says that by the time of the abolition of the slave trade in 1807, and the emancipation of the slaves in 1833, the sugar plantations of the British West Indies had lost their profitability, and it was in Britain's economic interest to emancipate the slaves.

Other researchers and historians have strongly contested what has come to be referred to as the "Williams thesis" in academia. David Richardson has concluded that the profits from the slave trade amounted to less than 1% of domestic investment in Britain. Economic historian Stanley Engerman finds that even without subtracting the associated costs of the slave trade (e.g., shipping costs, slave mortality, mortality of British people in Africa, defense costs) or reinvestment of profits back into the slave trade, the total profits from the slave trade and of West Indian plantations amounted to less than 5% of the British economy during any year of the Industrial Revolution. Engerman's 5% figure gives as much as possible in terms of benefit of the doubt to the Williams argument, not solely because it does not take into account the associated costs of the slave trade to Britain, but also because it carries the full-employment assumption from economics and holds the gross value of slave trade profits as a direct contribution to Britain's national income. Historian Richard Pares, in an article written before Williams' book, dismisses the influence of wealth generated from the West Indian plantations upon the financing of the Industrial Revolution, stating that whatever substantial flow of investment from West Indian profits into industry there occurred after emancipation, not before. However, each of these works focus primarily on the slave trade or the Industrial Revolution, and not the main body of the Williams thesis, which was on sugar and slavery itself. Therefore, they do not refute the main body of the Williams thesis.

Seymour Drescher and Robert Anstey argue the slave trade remained profitable until the end, and that moralistic reform, not economic incentive, was primarily responsible for abolition. They say slavery remained profitable in the 1830s because of innovations in agriculture. However, Drescher's Econocide wraps up its study in 1823, and does not address the majority of the Williams thesis, which covers the decline of the sugar plantations after 1823, the emancipation of the slaves in the 1830s, and the subsequent abolition of sugar duties in the 1840s. These arguments do not refute the main body of the Williams thesis, which presents economic data to show that the slave trade was minor compared to the wealth generated by sugar and slavery itself in the British Caribbean.

Karl Marx, in his influential economic history of capitalism, Das Kapital, wrote that "...the turning of Africa into a warren for the commercial hunting of black-skins, signaled the rosy dawn of the era of capitalist production". He argued that the slave trade was part of what he termed the "primitive accumulation" of capital, the 'non-capitalist' accumulation of wealth that preceded and created the financial conditions for Britain's industrialisation.

Demographics

The demographic effects of the slave trade is a controversial and highly debated issue. Although scholars such as Paul Adams and Erick D. Langer have estimated that sub-Saharan Africa represented about 18 percent of the world's population in 1600 and only 6 percent in 1900, the reasons for this demographic shift have been the subject of much debate. In addition to the depopulation Africa experienced because of the slave trade, African nations were left with severely imbalanced gender ratios, with females comprising up to 65 percent of the population in hard-hit areas such as Angola. Moreover, many scholars (such as Barbara N. Ramusack) have suggested a link between the prevalence of prostitution in Africa today with the temporary marriages that were enforced during the course of the slave trade.

Walter Rodney argued that the export of so many people had been a demographic disaster which left Africa permanently disadvantaged when compared to other parts of the world, and it largely explains the continent's continued poverty. He presented numbers showing that Africa's population stagnated during this period, while those of Europe and Asia grew dramatically. According to Rodney, all other areas of the economy were disrupted by the slave trade as the top merchants abandoned traditional industries in order to pursue slaving, and the lower levels of the population were disrupted by the slaving itself.

Others have challenged this view. J. D. Fage compared the demographic effect on the continent as a whole. David Eltis has compared the numbers to the rate of emigration from Europe during this period. In the 19th century alone over 50 million people left Europe for the Americas, a far higher rate than were ever taken from Africa.

Other scholars accused Walter Rodney of mischaracterizing the trade between Africans and Europeans. They argue that Africans, or more accurately African elites, deliberately let European traders join in an already large trade in enslaved people and that they were not patronized.

As Joseph E. Inikori argues, the history of the region shows that the effects were still quite deleterious. He argues that the African economic model of the period was very different from the European model, and could not sustain such population losses. Population reductions in certain areas also led to widespread problems. Inikori also notes that after the suppression of the slave trade Africa's population almost immediately began to rapidly increase, even prior to the introduction of modern medicines.

Legacy of racism

Walter Rodney states:

The role of slavery in promoting racist prejudice and ideology has been carefully studied in certain situations, especially in the USA. The simple fact is that no people can enslave another for four centuries without coming out with a notion of superiority, and when the colour and other physical traits of those peoples were quite different it was inevitable that the prejudice should take a racist form.

Eric Williams argued that "A racial twist [was] given to what is basically an economic phenomenon. Slavery was not born of racism: rather, racism was the consequence of slavery."

Similarly, John Darwin writes "The rapid conversion from white indentured labour to black slavery... made the English Caribbean a frontier of civility where English (later British) ideas about race and slave labour were ruthlessly adapted to local self-interest...Indeed, the root justification for the system of slavery and the savage apparatus of coercion on which its preservation depended was the ineradicable barbarism of the slave population, a product, it was argued, of its African origins".

End of the Atlantic slave trade

In Britain, America, Portugal and in parts of Europe, opposition developed against the slave trade. David Brion Davis says that abolitionists assumed "that an end to slave imports would lead automatically to the amelioration and gradual abolition of slavery". In Britain and America, opposition to the trade was led by members of the Religious Society of Friends (Quakers), Thomas Clarkson and establishment Evangelicals such as William Wilberforce in Parliament. Many people joined the movement and they began to protest against the trade, but they were opposed by the owners of the colonial holdings. Following Lord Mansfield's decision in 1772, many abolitionists and slave-holders believed that slaves became free upon entering the British isles. However, in reality slavery continued in Britain right up to abolition in the 1830s. The Mansfield ruling on Somerset v Stewart only decreed that a slave could not be transported out of England against his will.

Under the leadership of Thomas Jefferson, the new state of Virginia in 1778 became the first state and one of the first jurisdictions anywhere to stop the importation of slaves for sale; it made it a crime for traders to bring in slaves from out of state or from overseas for sale; migrants from within the United States were allowed to bring their own slaves. The new law freed all slaves brought in illegally after its passage and imposed heavy fines on violators. All the other states in the United States followed suit, although South Carolina reopened its slave trade in 1803.

Denmark, which had been active in the slave trade, was the first country to ban the trade through legislation in 1792, which took effect in 1803. Britain banned the slave trade in 1807, imposing stiff fines for any slave found aboard a British ship (see Slave Trade Act 1807). The Royal Navy moved to stop other nations from continuing the slave trade and declared that slaving was equal to piracy and was punishable by death. The United States Congress passed the Slave Trade Act of 1794, which prohibited the building or outfitting of ships in the U.S. for use in the slave trade. The U.S. Constitution barred a federal prohibition on importing slaves for 20 years; at that time the Act Prohibiting Importation of Slaves prohibited imports on the first day the Constitution permitted: January 1, 1808.

British abolitionism 

Quakers began to campaign against the British Empire's slave trade in the 1780s, and from 1789 William Wilberforce was a driving force in the British Parliament in the fight against the trade. The abolitionists argued that the trade was not necessary for the economic success of sugar on the British West Indian colonies. This argument was accepted by wavering politicians, who did not want to destroy the valuable and important sugar colonies of the British Caribbean. Parliament was also concerned about the success of the Haitian Revolution, and they believed they had to abolish the trade to prevent a similar conflagration from occurring in a British Caribbean colony.

On 22 February 1807, the House of Commons passed a motion 283 votes to 16 to abolish the Atlantic slave trade. Hence, the slave trade was abolished, but not the still-economically viable institution of slavery itself, which provided Britain's most lucrative import at the time, sugar. Abolitionists did not move against sugar and slavery itself until after the sugar industry went into terminal decline after 1823.

The United States passed its own Act Prohibiting Importation of Slaves the next week (March 2, 1807), although probably without mutual consultation.  The act only took effect on the first day of 1808; since a compromise clause in the US Constitution (Article 1, Section 9, Clause 1) prohibited federal, although not state, restrictions on the slave trade before 1808. The United States did not, however, abolish its internal slave trade, which became the dominant mode of US slave trading until the 1860s.  In 1805 the British Order-in-Council had restricted the importation of slaves into colonies that had been captured from France and the Netherlands. Britain continued to press other nations to end its trade; in 1810 an Anglo-Portuguese treaty was signed whereby Portugal agreed to restrict its trade into its colonies; an 1813 Anglo-Swedish treaty whereby Sweden outlawed its slave trade; the Treaty of Paris 1814 where France agreed with Britain that the trade is "repugnant to the principles of natural justice" and agreed to abolish the slave trade in five years; the 1814 Anglo-Dutch treaty where the Dutch outlawed its slave trade.

Castlereagh and Palmerston's diplomacy 
Abolitionist opinion in Britain was strong enough in 1807 to abolish the slave trade in all British possessions, although slavery itself persisted in the colonies until 1833. Abolitionists after 1807 focused on international agreements to abolish the slave trade. Foreign Minister Castlereagh switched his position and became a strong supporter of the movement. Britain arranged treaties with Portugal, Sweden and Denmark in the period between 1810 and 1814, whereby they agreed to end or restrict their trading. These were preliminary to the Congress of Vienna negotiations that Castlereagh dominated and which resulted in a general declaration condemning the slave trade. The problem was that the treaties and declarations were hard to enforce, given the very high profits available to private interests. As Foreign Minister, Castlereagh cooperated with senior officials to use the Royal Navy to detect and capture slave ships. He used diplomacy to make search-and-seize agreements with all the governments whose ships were trading. There was serious friction with the United States, where the southern slave interest was politically powerful. Washington recoiled at British policing of the high seas. Spain, France and Portugal also relied on the international slave trade to supply their colonial plantations.

As more and more diplomatic arrangements were made by Castlereagh, the owners of slave ships started flying false flags of nations that had not agreed, especially the United States. It was illegal under American law for American ships to engage in the slave trade, but the idea of Britain enforcing American laws was unacceptable to Washington. Lord Palmerston and other British foreign ministers continued the Castlereagh policies. Eventually, in 1842 in 1845, an arrangement was reached between London and Washington. With the arrival of a staunchly anti-slavery government in Washington in 1861, the Atlantic slave trade was doomed. In the long run, Castlereagh's strategy on how to stifle the slave trade proved successful.

Prime Minister Palmerston detested slavery, and in Nigeria in 1851 he took advantage of divisions in native politics, the presence of Christian missionaries, and the maneuvers of British consul John Beecroft to encourage the overthrow of King Kosoko. The new King Akitoye was a docile non-slave-trading puppet.

British Royal Navy 
The Royal Navy's West Africa Squadron, established in 1808, grew by 1850 to a force of some 25 vessels, which were tasked with combating slavery along the African coast. Between 1807 and 1860, the Royal Navy's Squadron seized approximately 1,600 ships involved in the slave trade and freed 150,000 Africans who were aboard these vessels. Several hundred slaves a year were transported by the navy to the British colony of Sierra Leone, where they were made to serve as "apprentices" in the colonial economy until the Slavery Abolition Act 1833.

Last slave ship to the United States 
Even though it was prohibited, after and in response to the North's reluctance or refusal to enforce the Fugitive Slave Act of 1850, the Atlantic slave trade was "re-opened by way of retaliation". In 1859, "the trade in slaves from Africa to the Southern coast of the United States is now carried on in defiance of Federal law and of the Federal Government."

The last known slave ship to land on U.S. soil was the Clotilda, which in 1859 illegally smuggled a number of Africans into the town of Mobile, Alabama. The Africans on board were sold as slaves; however, slavery in the U.S. was abolished five years later following the end of the American Civil War in 1865. Cudjoe Lewis, who died in 1935, was long believed to be the last survivor of Clotilda and the last surviving slave brought from Africa to the United States, but recent research has found that two other survivors from Clotilda outlived him, Redoshi (who died in 1937) and Matilda McCrear (who died in 1940).

However, according to Senator Stephen Douglas, Lincoln's opponent in the Lincoln–Douglas debates:

Brazil ends the Atlantic slave trade 
The last country to ban the Atlantic slave trade was Brazil in 1831. However, a vibrant illegal trade continued to ship large numbers of enslaved people to Brazil and also to Cuba until the 1860s, when British enforcement and further diplomacy finally ended the Atlantic slave trade. In 1870, Portugal ended the last trade route with the Americas, where the last country to import slaves was Brazil. In Brazil, however, slavery itself was not ended until 1888, making it the last country in the Americas to end involuntary servitude.

Economic motivation to end the slave trade

The historian Walter Rodney contends that it was a decline in the profitability of the triangular trades that made it possible for certain basic human sentiments to be asserted at the decision-making level in a number of European countries—Britain being the most crucial because it was the greatest carrier of African captives across the Atlantic. Rodney states that changes in productivity, technology, and patterns of exchange in Europe and the Americas informed the decision by the British to end their participation in the trade in 1807.

Nevertheless, Michael Hardt and Antonio Negri argue that it was neither a strictly economic nor moral matter. First, because slavery was (in practice) still beneficial to capitalism, providing not only an influx of capital but also disciplining hardship into workers (a form of "apprenticeship" to the capitalist industrial plant). The more "recent" argument of a "moral shift" (the basis of the previous lines of this article) is described by Hardt and Negri as an "ideological" apparatus in order to eliminate the sentiment of guilt in western society. Although moral arguments did play a secondary role, they usually had major resonance when used as a strategy to undercut competitors' profits. This argument holds that Eurocentric history has been blind to the most important element in this fight for emancipation, precisely, the constant revolt and the antagonism of slaves' revolts. The most important of those being the Haitian Revolution. The shock of this revolution in 1804, certainly introduces an essential political argument into the end of the slave trade, which happened only three years later.

However, both James Stephen and Henry Brougham, 1st Baron Brougham and Vaux wrote that the slave trade could be abolished for the benefit of the British colonies, and the latter's pamphlet was often used in parliamentary debates in favour of abolition. William Pitt the Younger argued on the basis of these writings that the British colonies would be better off, in economics as well as security, if the trade was abolished. As a result, according to historian Christer Petley, abolitionists argued, and even some absentee plantation owners accepted, that the trade could be abolished "without substantial damage to the plantation economy". William Grenville, 1st Baron Grenville argued that "the slave population of the colonies could be maintained without it." Petley points out that government took the decision to abolish the trade "with the express intention of improving, not destroying, the still-lucrative plantation economy of the British West Indies."

Legacy

Sierra Leone

In 1787, the British helped 400 freed slaves, primarily African Americans freed during the American Revolutionary War who had been evacuated to London, to relocate to Sierra Leone. Most of the first group of settlers died due to disease and warfare with indigenous peoples. About 64 survived to establish the second "Province of Freedom" following the failed first attempt at colonization between 1787 and 1789.

In 1792, 1200 Nova Scotian Settlers from Nova Scotia settled and established the Colony of Sierra Leone and the settlement of Freetown; these were newly freed African Americans and their descendants. Many of the adults had left Patriot owners and fought for the British in the Revolutionary War. The Crown had offered slaves freedom who left rebel masters, and thousands joined the British lines. More than 1,200 volunteered to settle and establish the new colony of Freetown, which was established by British abolitionists under the Sierra Leone Company.

Liberia

In 1816, a group of wealthy European-Americans, some of whom were abolitionists and others who were racial segregationists, founded the American Colonization Society with the express desire of sending liberated African Americans to West Africa. In 1820, they sent their first ship to Liberia, and within a decade around two thousand African Americans had been settled there. Such resettlement continued throughout the 19th century, increasing following the deterioration of race relations in the Southern states of the US following Reconstruction in 1877.

The American Colonization Society's proposal to send African Americans to Liberia was not universally popular among African-Americans, and the proposal was seen as a plot to weaken the influence of the abolitionist movement. The scheme was widely rejected by prominent African-American abolitionists such as James Forten and  Frederick Douglass.

Rastafari movement
The Rastafari movement, which originated in Jamaica, where 92% of the population are descended from the Atlantic slave trade, has made efforts to publicise the slavery and to ensure it is not forgotten, especially through reggae music.

Apologies

Worldwide

In 1998, UNESCO designated 23 August as International Day for the Remembrance of the Slave Trade and its Abolition. Since then there have been a number of events recognizing the effects of slavery.

At the 2001 World Conference Against Racism in Durban, South Africa, African nations demanded a clear apology for slavery from the former slave-trading countries. Some nations were ready to express an apology, but the opposition, mainly from the United Kingdom, Portugal, Spain, the Netherlands, and the United States blocked attempts to do so. A fear of monetary compensation might have been one of the reasons for the opposition. As of 2009, efforts are underway to create a UN Slavery Memorial as a permanent remembrance of the victims of the Atlantic slave trade.

Benin
In 1999, President Mathieu Kerekou of Benin (formerly the Kingdom of Dahomey) issued a national apology for the role Africans played in the Atlantic slave trade. Luc Gnacadja, minister of environment and housing for Benin, later said: "The slave trade is a shame, and we do repent for it." Researchers estimate that 3 million slaves were exported out of the Slave Coast bordering the Bight of Benin.

Denmark

Denmark had foothold in Ghana for more than 200 years and trafficked as many as 4,000 enslaved Africans per year.
Danish Foreign Minister, Uffe Ellemann-Jensen declared publicly in 1992:
"I understand why the inhabitants in the West Indian Islands celebrate the day they became part of the U.S. But for Danish people and Denmark the day is a dark chapter. We exploited the slaves in the West Indian Islands during 250 years and made good money on them, but when we had to pay wages, we sold them instead, without even asking the inhabitants (…) That really wasn't a decent thing to do. We could at least have called a referendum, and asked people which nation they wanted to belong to. Instead we just let down the people."

France
On 30 January 2006, Jacques Chirac (the then French President) said that 10 May would henceforth be a national day of remembrance for the victims of slavery in France, marking the day in 2001 when France passed a law recognising slavery as a crime against humanity.

Ghana
President Jerry Rawlings of Ghana apologized for his country's involvement in the slave trade.

Netherlands
At a UN conference on the Atlantic slave trade in 2001, the Dutch Minister for Urban Policy and Integration of Ethnic Minorities Roger van Boxtel said that the Netherlands "recognizes the grave injustices of the past." On 1 July 2013, at the 150th anniversary of the abolition of slavery in the Dutch West Indies, the Dutch government expressed "deep regret and remorse" for the involvement of the Netherlands in the Atlantic slave trade. Prime Minister of the Netherlands Mark Rutte apologized for the Netherlands' role in the history of slavery on 19 December 2022. The municipal government of Amsterdam, which co-owned the colony of Surinam, and De Nederlandsche Bank, which was involved in slavery between 1814 and 1863, had already apologized for their involvement on 1 July 2021 and 1 July 2022, respectively.

Nigeria
In 2009, the Civil Rights Congress of Nigeria has written an open letter to all African chieftains who participated in trade calling for an apology for their role in the Atlantic slave trade: "We cannot continue to blame the white men, as Africans, particularly the traditional rulers, are not blameless. In view of the fact that the Americans and Europe have accepted the cruelty of their roles and have forcefully apologized, it would be logical, reasonable and humbling if African traditional rulers ... [can] accept blame and formally apologize to the descendants of the victims of their collaborative and exploitative slave trade."

United Kingdom
On 9 December 1999, Liverpool City Council passed a formal motion apologising for the city's part in the slave trade. It was unanimously agreed that Liverpool acknowledges its responsibility for its involvement in three centuries of the slave trade. The City Council has made an unreserved apology for Liverpool's involvement and the continual effect of slavery on Liverpool's black communities.

On 27 November 2006, British Prime Minister Tony Blair made a partial apology for Britain's role in the African slavery trade. However African rights activists denounced it as "empty rhetoric" that failed to address the issue properly. They feel his apology stopped shy to prevent any legal retort. Blair again apologized on 14 March 2007.

On 24 August 2007, Ken Livingstone (Mayor of London) apologized publicly for London's role in the slave trade. "You can look across there to see the institutions that still have the benefit of the wealth they created from slavery," he said, pointing towards the financial district, before breaking down in tears. He said that London was still tainted by the horrors of slavery. Jesse Jackson praised Mayor Livingstone and added that reparations should be made.

United States
On 24 February 2007, the Virginia General Assembly passed House Joint Resolution Number 728 acknowledging "with profound regret the involuntary servitude of Africans and the exploitation of Native Americans, and call for reconciliation among all Virginians". With the passing of that resolution, Virginia became the first of the 50 United States to acknowledge through the state's governing body their state's involvement in slavery. The passing of this resolution came on the heels of the 400th-anniversary celebration of the city of Jamestown, Virginia, which was the first permanent English colony to survive in what would become the United States. Jamestown is also recognized as one of the first slave ports of the American colonies. On 31 May 2007, the Governor of Alabama, Bob Riley, signed a resolution expressing "profound regret" for Alabama's role in slavery and apologizing for slavery's wrongs and lingering effects. Alabama is the fourth state to pass a slavery apology, following votes by the legislatures in Maryland, Virginia, and North Carolina.

On 30 July 2008, the United States House of Representatives passed a resolution apologizing for American slavery and subsequent discriminatory laws. The language included a reference to the "fundamental injustice, cruelty, brutality and inhumanity of slavery and Jim Crow" segregation. On 18 June 2009, the United States Senate issued an apologetic statement decrying the "fundamental injustice, cruelty, brutality, and inhumanity of slavery". The news was welcomed by President Barack Obama.

See also

 Atlantic history
 Atlantic slave trade to Brazil
 Barbary slave trade
 Bristol slave trade (UK)
 Edward Colston
 Indian indenture system
 Indian Ocean slave trade
 Liverpool slave trade
 Piracy
 The Slave Route Project
 Slave Trade Acts
 Slavery in Britain
 Slavery in Canada
 Slavery in contemporary Africa
 Slavery in the colonial United States
 Slavery in the Ottoman Empire
 Slavery in the Spanish New World colonies
 Slavery in the United States
 Tobacco and Slaves (1986 book)
 Trans-Saharan slave trade
 United States labor law
 Zephaniah Kingsley

References

Citations

General bibliography

Academic books

Academic articles

Non-academic sources 
 Revealing Histories, Remembering Slavery.
 Afro Atlantic Histories resource, National Gallery of Art, Washington DC.

Further reading 

 Anstey, Roger: The Atlantic Slave Trade and British Abolition, 1760–1810. London: Macmillan, 1975. .
 Araujo, Ana Lucia. Public Memory of Slavery: Victims and Perpetrators in the South Atlantic Cambria Press, 2010. 
 Bailey, Anne. African Voices of the Atlantic Slave Trade: Beyond the Silence and the Shame. Boston: Beacon Press, 2006. 
 
 Boruki, David Eltis, and David Wheat, "Atlantic History and the Slave Trade to Spanish America." American Historical Review 120, no. 2 (April 2015).
 Clarke, Dr. John Henrik: Christopher Columbus and the Afrikan Holocaust: Slavery and the Rise of European Capitalism. Brooklyn, NY: A & B Books, 1992. .
 
 
 Domingues da Silva, Daniel B. The Atlantic Slave Trade from West Central Africa, 1780–1867. Cambridge: Cambridge University Press, 2017. 
 
 Eltis, David: "The volume and structure of the transatlantic slave trade: a reassessment", William and Mary Quarterly (2001): 17–46. in JSTOR
 Eltis, David. The Rise of African Slavery in the Americas. New York: Cambridge University Press, 2000.
 Eltis, David, and David Richardson, eds. Extending the Frontiers: Essays on the New Transatlantic Slave Trade Database. New Haven: Yale University Press, 2008.
 Emmer, Pieter C.: The Dutch in the Atlantic Economy, 1580–1880. Trade, Slavery and Emancipation. Variorum Collected Studies Series CS614. Aldershot [u.a.]: Variorum, 1998.
 
 Green, Toby. The Rise of the Trans-Atlantic Slave Trade in Western Africa, 1300–1589. New York: Cambridge University Press, 2012.
 Guasco, Michael. Slaves and Englishmen: Human Bondage in the Early Modern Atlantic. Philadelphia: University of Pennsylvania Press, 2014.
 Hall, Gwendolyn Midlo: Slavery and African Ethnicities in the Americas: Restoring the Links. Chapel Hill, NC: The University of North Carolina Press, 2006. .
 Heywood, Linda and John K. Thornton, Central Africans, Atlantic Creoles, and the Foundation of the Americas, 1585–1660. New York: Cambridge University Press 2007.
 Horne, Gerald: The Deepest South: The United States, Brazil, and the African Slave Trade. New York: New York University Press, 2007. .
 
 Klein, Herbert S. (2010). The Atlantic Slave Trade (2nd ed.)
 Lindsay, Lisa A. Captives as Commodities: The Transatlantic Slave Trade. Prentice Hall, 2008. 
 McMillin, James A. The Final Victims: Foreign Slave Trade to North America, 1783–1810, . Includes database on CD-ROM.
 Meltzer, Milton: Slavery: A World History. New York: Da Capo Press, 1993. .
 Miller, Christopher L. The French Atlantic Triangle: Literature and Culture of the Slave Trade. Durham, NC: Duke University Press, 2008 
 Nimako, Kwame and Willemsen, Glenn. The Dutch Atlantic: Slavery, Abolition and Emancipation. London: Pluto Press, 2011. 
 Newson, Linda and Susie Minchin, From Capture to Sale: The Portuguese Slave Trade to Spanish South America in the Early Seventeenth Century. Leiden: Brill 2007.
 Northrup, David (ed.). The Atlantic Slave Trade Independence, KY: Wadsworth Cengage, 2010. 
 Rawley, James A., and Stephen D. Behrendt: The Transatlantic Slave Trade: A History (University of Nebraska Press, 2005)
 Rediker, Marcus. The Slave Ship: A Human History. New York: Penguin Books, 2008 
 Rodney, Walter: How Europe Underdeveloped Africa. Washington, DC: Howard University Press; Revised ed., 1981. .
 Rodriguez, Junius P. (ed.), Encyclopedia of Emancipation and Abolition in the Transatlantic World. Armonk, NY: M. E. Sharpe, 2007. .
 Smallwood, Stephanie E. Saltwater Slavery: A Middle Passage from Africa to American Diaspora. Cambridge, MA: Harvard University Press, 2008. 
 Schultz, Kara. "The Kingdom of Angola is not very far from here: The South Atlantic Slave Port of Buenos Aires, 1585–1640." Slavery & Abolition 36, no. 3 (2015).
 
 Solow, Barbara (ed.), Slavery and the Rise of the Atlantic System. Cambridge: Cambridge University Press, 1991. .
 Thomas, Hugh: The Slave Trade: The History of the Atlantic Slave Trade 1440–1870. London: Picador, 1997. 
 Thornton, John: Africa and Africans in the Making of the Atlantic World, 1400–1800, 2nd ed., Cambridge University Press, 1998. .
 
 Wheat, David. Atlantic Africa and the Spanish Caribbean, 1570–1640. Chapel Hill: University of North Carolina Press, 2016.
 Wheat, David. "The First Great Waves: African Provenance Zones for the Transatlantic Slave Trade to Cartagena de Indias". Journal of African History 52, no. 1 (March 2011). pp. 1–22. .

External links

 Voyages: The Trans-Atlantic Slave Trade Database 
 Quick guide: The slave trade – BBC News
 Slave Trade and Abolition of slavery – Teaching resources at Black History 4 Schools
 British documents on slave holding and the slave trade, 1788–1793

1525 establishments
1870 disestablishments
African slave trade
Black British history
Early Modern period
European colonisation in Africa
European colonization of the Americas
Forced migration
Genocides in North America
Genocides in Africa
History of English colonialism
History of sugar
Slave trade
Slavery in the Caribbean
Anti-black racism
Slavery in North America
Slavery in South America
Slavery in the British Empire
Trade routes